Only Heaven is the fourth album by Industrial band The Young Gods. It was released in 1995 on Interscope Records.

Accolades
The information regarding accolades acquired from AcclaimedMusic.net

Track listing
 "Outside" - 0:31
 "Strangel" - 3:07
 "Speed of Night" - 6:00
 "Donnez Les Esprits" - 6:17
 "Moon Revolutions" - 16:35
 "Kissing the Sun" - 4:30
 "The Dreamhouse" - 4:52
 "Lointaine" - 4:20
 "Gardez Les Esprits" - 1:08
 "Child in the Tree" - 4:35
 "Kissing The Sun (Orange Mix)" - 9:18 (bonus track on some releases)

Chart performance

Album

Personnel

The Young Gods
Urs Hiestand – drums
Alain Monod – keyboards
Franz Treichler – vocals

Additional musicians and production
Erwin Autique – engineering
Yaron Fuchs – engineering
Chris Laidlaw – assistant engineering
Roli Mosimann – production, mixing
Gary Townsley – assistant engineering
 Howie Weinberg – mastering

Footnotes

The Young Gods albums
Albums produced by Roli Mosimann
1995 albums